Hamad Niazi (1891 – 1950) was an Egyptian fencer. He competed in the individual sabre event at the 1928 Summer Olympics.

References

External links
 

1891 births
1950 deaths
Egyptian male foil fencers
Olympic fencers of Egypt
Fencers at the 1928 Summer Olympics
20th-century Egyptian people